The 2017 Southwestern Athletic Conference baseball tournament will be held place at Wesley Barrow Stadium in New Orleans, Louisiana, from May 17 through 21. The winner of the tournament will earn the conference's automatic bid to the 2017 NCAA Division I baseball tournament.

The double elimination tournament features four teams from each division.

Seeding and format
The four eligible teams in each division will be seeded one through four, with the top seed from each division facing the fourth seed from the opposite division in the first round, and so on.  The teams then play a two bracket, double-elimination tournament with a one-game final between the winners of each bracket.

Bracket

References

Tournament
Southwestern Athletic Conference Baseball Tournament
Southwestern Athletic Conference baseball tournament
Southwestern Athletic Conference baseball tournament